Pliomys is an extinct genus of forest voles, subfamily Arvicolinae, tribe Pliomyini (Musser and Carleton, 2005). One member is the extinct species Pliomys episcopalis. The genus was described by Méhely in 1914, and is paraphyletic with respect to Dinaromys.

References

 Musser, G. G. and M. D. Carleton. 2005. Superfamily Muroidea. pp. 894–1531 in Mammal Species of the World a Taxonomic and Geographic Reference. D. E. Wilson and D. M. Reeder eds. Johns Hopkins University Press, Baltimore.

Voles and lemmings
Prehistoric rodent genera
Neogene mammals of Europe